Wõrumaa Teataja (1995-2001 Võrumaa Teataja) is newspaper published in Võru, Estonia.

Its precursor was Võru Teataja; published in 1988–1994.

References

External links
 

Newspapers published in Estonia
Võru